Skipton (also known as Skipton-in-Craven) is a market town and civil parish in the Craven district of North Yorkshire, England. Historically in the East Division of Staincliffe Wapentake in the West Riding of Yorkshire, it is on the River Aire and the Leeds and Liverpool Canal to the south of the Yorkshire Dales. At the 2011 Census, the population was 14,623.

The town was listed in the 2018 Sunday Times report on Best Places to Live in northern England.

History

The name Skipton means 'sheep-town', a northern dialect form of Shipton.  Its name derives from the Old English sceap (sheep) and tun (town or village).The name is recorded in the Domesday Book of 1086. It was important during the English Civil War and was the site of prisoner of war camps during the First and Second World Wars.

Skipton Castle was built in 1090 as a wooden motte-and-bailey by Robert de Romille, a Norman baron. In the 12th century William le Gros strengthened it with a stone keep to repel attacks from the Kingdom of Scotland to the north, the castle elevated Skipton from a poor dependent village to a burgh administered by a reeve. The protection offered by Skipton Castle during the Middle Ages encouraged the urbanisation of the surrounding area, and during times of war and disorder the town attracted an influx of families. It is now one of the most complete and best preserved medieval castles in England and is open to the public.

One of the oldest mills in North Yorkshire, High Corn Mill is powered by the waters of Eller Beck, and dates to 1310 when it was owned by Robert de Clifford, 1st Baron de Clifford; at that point it was transferred to the powerful Clifford family by the then King Edward II. 
Skipton became a prosperous market town, trading sheep and woollen goods. A market stemming from its formative years still survives. In the 19th century, Skipton emerged as a small mill town connected to the major cities by the Leeds and Liverpool Canal and its branch Thanet Canal, (known locally as 'Springs branch canal'). 

During the 20th century Skipton's economy shifted to tourism, aided by its historic architecture and proximity to the Yorkshire Dales. Since 1974, Skipton has been the seat of Craven District Council. The Skipton Building Society was founded in the town. In 2016 Skipton was voted the best place to live in England for the second time, having been voted for by the Sunday Times, two years earlier.

Governance

Skipton is part of the parliamentary constituency of Skipton and Ripon, which was created in 1983. Since its creation, the constituency has returned a Conservative Member of Parliament (MP). , the seat is held by Julian Smith, a former Secretary of State for Northern Ireland. Before 1983 Skipton had its own eponymous constituency.

Skipton forms part of Craven District, a non-metropolitan district, and is home of the offices of Craven District Council. In 2007, proposals to make North Yorkshire County Council a unitary authority, removing the layer of government represented by Craven District, were rejected.

Skipton has its own town council consisting of 16 councillors, formed by 4 members from each of the four wards within the parish boundaries, North, East, South and West. Skipton town councillors elect a town mayor each year at an annual general meeting. As of 2018, the town mayor is Councillor Alan Hickman. The town council offices are based on the high street, upstairs in the Town Hall.

Economy

The town's major local employer is Skipton Building Society, with its subsidiary companies. 
The town is  home to several holiday companies, including Blue Water Holidays and several cottage holiday firms.  It is a centre for recruitment agencies, with several hundred people employed in this sector.  Recruitment firms include Medacs, HCL Doctors, Templars, Holt Doctors and Medic International LMS Recruitment Systems Ltd. and Justteachers.  Tourism and retail sales are significant.  The Global Environmental Engineer JBA Consulting is headquartered here. 

The town is known as the "Gateway to the Dales", because of its close proximity to the Yorkshire Dales. Skipton has many visitors, particularly on market days (Monday, Wednesday, Friday and Saturday). As Skipton is the nearest and largest town to most of the small towns and villages within the Dales, it attracts numerous shoppers. In 2008, the Academy of Urbanism voted High Street the best shopping spot in Britain. The wide main street used to host the sheep market, but now a general market is held there four days a week and livestock is auctioned at the Auction Mart on the western edge of the town. The town has three official allotment sites.

Chocolatier Whittakers, based in the town, was established in 1889 in nearby Cross Hills. Ida Whittaker began making chocolates there in 1903, taught by the wife of the vicar of Kildwick.

Culture and community

On Saturday 13 July 1901, a gala was held in Skipton to raise money for the Skipton and District Cottage Hospital, built at the time of Queen Victoria's Jubilee, held on the Brick Buildings Fields off Bailey Road. This was such a major event in the area that extra trains were provided to bring visitors to the town from miles around. After the formation of the National Health Service, with the Skipton General Hospital being funded from central government, the Skipton Charities Gala continued raising money for local charities and non-profit-making organisations. The gala, held every year on the second Saturday in June, starts with a procession through the town centre to Aireville Park, where live performance acts entertain the public, culminating in live music and a firework display.

Today, main events in Skipton include the annual heritage event Skipton Sheep Day which takes place on the first Sunday in July on Skipton High Street and showcases what Skipton and the Yorkshire Dales has to offer with demonstrations, stalls, entertainment and food on offer. Another main event on the annual calendar is Skipton Christmas Market which has been constantly voted in the top 10 of the UK's best Christmas Markets.

Skipton Town Hall holds regular craft fairs and special events and houses the Craven Museum & Gallery as well as a tourist information centre. Skipton Little Theatre is located near the town centre. The Mart Theatre opened in October 2005 with funding from the European Regional Development Fund, Yorkshire Forward, Craven District Council and the Arts Council England. It provides rural theatre, events and other facilities within a functioning Auction Mart.

In March 2014 The Sunday Times judged Skipton as the "best place to live" in Britain. In 2016 the paper said it was amongst the nine best towns in Yorkshire and the North East due to its market, schools and being close to the Dales,

Skipton is twinned with the Bavarian town of Simbach.  In May 2009 the town council decided to proceed with twinning with Erquinghem-Lys in France.

Skipton has numerous public houses, three nightclubs and several restaurants.

The local newspaper is the Craven Herald & Pioneer.

Transport

Skipton lies close to the junction of the A65 road (from Leeds to the Lake District) and the A59 from York to Liverpool. The north section (A65 & A59) of the £16.4 million Skipton Bypass opened in December 1981. The rest of the  bypass (A629) opened in October 1982, greatly reducing journey times to the Dales.

Skipton railway station gives access southbound to regular services for Leeds and Bradford on the electrified Airedale Line; northbound services connect to Lancaster, Morecambe and Carlisle, The route to Carlisle is along the scenic Settle-Carlisle Railway, passing over the Ribblehead Viaduct.

Skipton bus station was rebuilt in 2009 and is the focal point for bus services throughout the local area.

The Leeds and Liverpool Canal runs through Skipton and is a popular destination for tourists, with walking and boat hire.

Education

Primary education
Non-denominational:
Greatwood Community Primary School
Water Street Community Primary School
Ings Community Primary School
Roman Catholic:
St Stephen's Catholic Primary School
Church of England:
Christ Church Primary School
Parish Church Primary School

Secondary education
As well as The Skipton Academy (ages 11–16), there are two single-sex grammar schools: Ermysted's Grammar School for boys, and Skipton Girls' High School (SGHS). Both schools are selective by entrance exam and obtain comparable high A-Level scores. On the basis of the 2009 A level results Ermysted's performed 13th best in the UK and SGHS was rated 42nd, but in 2011 later it was rated at number 44.

Further education
Craven College
Craven College is next to "The Skipton Academy. "

Sport
Skipton is home to Skipton Town A.F.C.; Skipton Juniors F.C.; Skipton Cricket Club, Skipton Church Institute Cricket Club and Skipton Kashmir, all cricket clubs; Skipton Cycling Club; Skipton Swimming Club; Skipton Athletics Club; Skipton Karate Centre; Strike Taekwondo; Craven Energy Triathlon Club; Skipton R.F.C., a rugby union club and Skipton Golf Club, founded in 1893. The Coulthurst Craven Sports Centre is adjacent to the rugby club, with facilities including all-weather football pitches and squash courts. Skipton Tennis Club is also adjacent to the Sports Centre and has been awarded the LTA Club of the Year Award on several occasions. There are a number of gyms in the town, a public swimming pool, an outdoor skatepark and a pump track. Skipton is host to a free weekly Parkrun event which takes place in Aireville Park.

On 5 July 2014, the Tour de France Stage 1 from Leeds to Harrogate passed through the town.

Notable people
A number of notable people have been born in Skipton. The philosopher Henry Sidgwick was born in Skipton in 1838. Thomas Spencer, the co-founder of Marks & Spencer, was born in Queen's Court, Skipton in 1858. The American mathematician Thomas William Edmondson was born in Skipton in 1869. Geoffrey Dawson, editor of The Times from 1912 to 1919 and from 1923 until 1941, was born in Skipton in 1874.

Two politicians were born in Skipton: the former Conservative MP and Chancellor of the Exchequer Iain Macleod in 1913, and the Labour MP Joan Humble in 1951. Former British Prime Minister Winston Churchill's personal physician during the Second World War, Charles Wilson, the first Baron Moran, was born in Skipton in 1882.

The poet and author Blake Morrison was born in Skipton in 1950. The former Manchester City footballer Rick Holden was born in Skipton in 1964. The actress Elaine Glover, who appeared in Footballers' Wives and HolbyBlue, was born in Skipton in 1983.
Former Lancashire and England cricketer and current head coach of Lancashire County Cricket Club, Glen Chapple was born in Skipton in 1974. Former England and Leicestershire cricketer, and current England national selector, James Whitaker was born in Skipton in 1962.
Rhoda Bloodworth (1889–1980), New Zealand labour activist, community worker and feminist, born in Skipton.

See also
 Holy Trinity Church, Skipton
 Plaza Cinema, Skipton
 St Stephen's Church, Skipton
 Craven Heifer

References

External links

 Skipton Town Council
 Skipton Chamber of Trade and Commerce
 Skipton Business Improvement District or Skipton Town Partnership

 
Market towns in North Yorkshire
Civil parishes in North Yorkshire
Craven District
Towns in North Yorkshire